Cherry Hill (formerly Holthanger and Southern Court), is a modernist style house on the Wentworth Estate in Virginia Water, Surrey, England, designed by architect Oliver Hill and completed in 1935. Originally called Holthanger, it was renamed Southern Court and subsequently Cherry Hill.

The property was commissioned by Katherine Hannah Newton, a wealthy single woman, whose family company, Newton, Chambers & Co., was one of England's largest industrial companies. Unlike the surrounding Walter George Tarrant houses being built on the Wentworth Estate at the time, Modern Movement houses such as Holthanger were expensive "one-off" solutions designed to satisfy the needs of private individuals and included provision for motor cars, sophisticated kitchen and heating and electrical equipment and for accommodating domestic staff.

Oliver Hill design
The building is a two-storey house built of brick and rendered white with a flat roof and a blue tinted cylindrical water tower as a roof feature. The plan is a shallow curve which took into account the Scots pines trees to the north of the site. A projecting semi circular fully glazed staircase tower rises to the full height of the building enclosing a grand circular staircase. The central plan figure extends at each end with ancillary accommodation in two wings.  To maximise the sunlight and the views, all of the principal rooms were located on the south elevation. The ground floor living room, semi circular sun room and kitchen space are all recessed at ground floor forming a loggia to either side, and accessed from the dining room with the first floor accommodation above supported on slender circular concrete ‘piloti’. The house is set back from the road with a winding drive and dense landscaping that keeps it hidden from public view. Marion Dorn, the textiles designer, designed the original curtains for the property.

The property was featured in an American exhibition titled ‘Modern British Architecture’ at the Museum of Modern Art, New York in 1937.

Grade II listed by English Heritage in August 1986, it is the only remaining listed building on the Wentworth Estate following the demolition of Greenside in 2003.

Alterations 
In 1968 permission was granted for the garage to be converted to a living room and for a roof enclosure to terrace to form a garage. In 1972, a horse stable and tack room were permitted. The previous extensions were removed, the interior was restored and the ground-floor was reformed.

The original form and central plan arrangement of the principal rooms of the house remains largely intact together with the original curved staircase, slender steel framed curved stair window and curved timber handrail detail to the top of the central curved baluster wall.

Previous owners 
24 September 1930, Katherine Hannah Newton, Director of Newton, Chambers & Co. She died in May 1945 and left a gross estate valued at £200,000
3 December 1945, Donald Robert Ivar Campbell, and Sheila Kathleen Campbell (wife). Purchase price £12,000. He was a Charterhouse educated stockbroker, who then became a film director, producer and writer. In 1960, he purchased Tiverton Castle in Devon.
3 September 1954, George Richard Mount, son of Sir William Mount, 1st Baronet of Wasing Place and Lady Hilda Lucy Adelaide Low. He was Chairman and Managing Director of Lennards Ltd, a footwear company that had 250 stores and a factory in Bristol.
1958, John Hay Whitney, United States Ambassador to the UK, publisher, art collector, philanthropist and investor. Whitney renamed the property after the exclusive Cherry Hills Country Club in Denver, Colorado where he and President Dwight D. Eisenhower enjoyed playing golf, close to Eisenhower’s “Summer White House”.

References

Further reading

External links 
 Cherry Hill website
 The house, as photographed by Dell & Wainwright in 1935.

Grade II listed buildings in Surrey
Oliver Hill (architect) buildings
Modernist architecture in England